The 1923 Akron Pros season was their fourth in the league. The team failed to improve on their previous output of 3–5–2, winning only one game. They tied for sixteenth place in the league.

Schedule

Standings

References

Akron Pros seasons
Akron Pros
Akron Pros